The 12105 / 12106 Vidarbha Express is a Express train belonging to Indian Railways – Central Railway zone that runs between Mumbai CSMT and  in Maharashtra. It is a daily service. It operates as train number 12105 from Mumbai CSMT to Gondia and as train number 12106 in the reverse direction.

Coaches

The 12105/12106 Vidarbha Express has 1 [Indian Railways coaching stock|AC 1st Class]  [[Indian Railways coaching stock 3 AC 2 tier, 1 [[Indian Railways coaching stock, 5 [Indian Railways coaching stock|AC 3 tier]], 7 [Indian Railways coaching stock|Sleeper Class] & 4 General Unreserved coaches.

As with most train services in India, coach composition may be amended at the discretion of Indian Railways depending on demand.

The service was the first air-brake rake train from Nagpur Division of Central Railways and used to have green-blue liveried coaches when introduced with D suffixed on coach numbers at end. The rake was later on transferred to Mumbai Division when it was extended to Gondia.

Service

The 12105/12106 Vidarbha Superfast Express initially ran between Mumbai CSMT &  and was later extended to Gondia.

It is a daily service covering the distance of 967 km in 16 hours as 2105 & 16 hours 05 mins as 12106 at an average speed of 60.44 km/hr in both directions.

Routing
12105/12106 Vidarbha Superfast Express runs  Mumbai CSMT. Dadar.Thane. Kalyan. Igatpuri. Nashik Road.  Manmad.  Jalgaon.  Bhusawal. Akola. Wardha. 
Nagpur.  Kamptee Tumsar Road Bhandara Road. Tirora Gondia.

Traction

It is hauled by a Ajni or Kalyan based WAP-7 locomotive from end to end.

Trivia

Now engine swap does not take place in Igatpuri.

Operation

12105 Vidarbha Express leaves Mumbai CSMT every day at 19:05 hrs IST and reaches Gondia the next day at 11:15 hrs IST.

On return, the 12106 Vidarbha Express leaves Gondia every day at 14:55 hrs IST and reaches Mumbai CSMT the next day at 7:00 hrs IST.

References

External links 
 Famous Trains in India.

Express trains in India
Transport in Mumbai
Transport in Nagpur
Rail transport in Maharashtra
Vidarbha
Named passenger trains of India